Parapoynx andalusica is a species of moth in the family Crambidae. It is found in Spain and Portugal.

References

Moths described in 1982
Acentropinae